The Samsung SGH-i907, marketed as the Samsung Epix in the United States by AT&T Wireless, is a Windows Mobile-based quad-band GSM smartphone manufactured by Samsung.

Features 
The device has a candy bar form factor and a 320×320 resistive touchscreen. A QWERTY keyboard with the numeric keys overlaid on keys in the third to fifth column of the keyboard, an optical trackpad, and the touchscreen are used for input. The trackpad has two modes of operation: in one mode, it acts as a mouse (with a mouse cursor displayed on the screen), and in the other, it acts as an 8-directional D-pad.

The phone features 150 MB of internal storage, but its storage capacity can be expanded via microSDHC cards up to 32GB.

Software
The phone comes with Pocket Internet Explorer and Windows Media Player, and includes Microsoft Office Mobile, with mobile versions of Microsoft Word, Excel, Pocket Outlook, OneNote Mobile, and PowerPoint Mobile. Additional programs can be added through Microsoft ActiveSync, or the AT&T Mall.

ActiveSync functionality prescribes that the computer be equipped with ActiveSync 4.5 or newer. The earliest operating systems on which ActiveSync 4.5 can be installed, are Windows NT Workstation 4.0 SP6 (or later) and Windows Me, requiring Internet Explorer 6 to be present in either case. On Windows Vista, connectivity is also possible with Windows Mobile Device Center for Windows Vista.

Text messages can be spell-checked.

Issues 
A fair number of users report a "SLOG DUMP" error message appearing on the screen, after which the phone exhibited various issues such as the phone being unable to receive calls or freezing. In many cases, such problems can be corrected by rebooting the device or removing the battery. The phone also stops playing all audio at times, and the touchscreen may also stop responding. If a standard reboot or battery removal does not fix the problem, the phone can be started in "format mode" for a more complete reboot.

Samsung released an ID1 update addressing many of the issues reported by users, but users report that the update actually made things worse, introducing things such as a dialing lag or all incoming calls going straight to voicemail.

Windows Mobile 6.5 
Samsung has released an official upgrade to Windows Mobile 6.5 for the Epix, in June 2010. Users have had success installing unofficial Windows Mobile 6.5 on the Epix for the last year, although it currently has various issues such as artifacts appearing around the mouse pointer. The official release fixes most of the problems in the unofficial ROM, including the mouse pointer, GPS issues, speed, and battery life.

Specifications 
Specifications from the Samsung website:

 Processor: Marvell PXA310 624 MHz
 Screen size: 2.5 inches
 Dimensions: 4.56 x 2.41 x 0.51 inches
 Weight: 4.4 ounces
 Operating System: Windows Mobile Professional 6.1/6.5
 RAM: 150 MB
 ROM: 256 MB
 Expandable storage: microSD slot, supports up to 32 GB microSDHC cards
 Screen: 320 x 320 pixels, 65K colors, resistive touchscreen
 Input method: touchscreen, QWERTY keypad, and optical trackpad
 Frequency bands: Quad-band GSM (850, 900, 1800, and 1900 MHz), tri-band HSDPA
 Data connection: 3G (UMTS and HSDPA) and 2G (EDGE and GPRS)
aGPS on-board
Wi-Fi capable: IEEE 802.11b, IEEE 802.11g
 Bluetooth 2.0
 2.0 megapixel camera that can take still photos and videos
 Multiple resolutions: 1600 x 1200, 640 x 480, 320 x 240, and 176 x 144
 4X digital zoom
 Self timer
 Multi-shot
 Brightness level adjustment
 Mosaic Shooting Mode
 No flash
 Supported video formats: MPEG4, H.263, WMV, 3GP
 Supported audio formats: MP3, WAV, AAC, AAC+, eAAC+
 Battery: Removable 3.7 Volt Lithium-ion, 1800 mAh, up to 7 hours of talk time and up to 14 days of standby

References

External links
 Official Samsung Epix site
 Samsung Epix user manual (AT&T)
 Reviews:  PocketNow, MobileTechReview, WMExperts
 Resources:  MySamsungEpix.com
CareAce-Samsung Epix support

Samsung mobile phones
Mobile phones introduced in 2008
Mobile phones with an integrated hardware keyboard